Shibi may refer to:

Shibi (king), a figure in Hindu and Buddhist mythology 
Shibi (roof tile), a roof ornament in Japanese traditional architecture
Shibi Khan, 9th khagan of the Göktürk empire, a rebel against Chinese suzerainty, reigned 611–619 CE

China
Shibi Railway Station, or New Guangzhou Railway Station, a railway station in Panyu, Guangzhou
Shibi, Fujian (石壁镇), town in Ninghua County
Shibi, Hainan (石壁镇), town in Qionghai
Shibi, Jiangxi (石鼻镇), town in Anyi County